The Apurímac spinetail (Synallaxis courseni) is a species of bird in the family Furnariidae. It is endemic to Peru.

Its natural habitat is subtropical or tropical moist montane forests. It is threatened by habitat loss.

References

External links
BirdLife Species Factsheet.

Apurímac spinetail
Birds of the Peruvian Andes
Endemic birds of Peru
Apurímac spinetail
Taxonomy articles created by Polbot